In zoological nomenclature, the valid name of a taxon is the sole correct scientific name. The valid name should be used for that taxon, instead of any other name that may currently be being used, or may previously have been used. A name is valid when, and only when, it is in harmony with all the relevant rules listed in the International Code of Zoological Nomenclature (ICZN). A valid name is the correct zoological name of a taxon. 

In contrast, a name which violates the rules of the ICZN is known as an invalid name. An invalid name is not considered to be the correct scientific name for a taxon.

There are numerous different kinds of invalid names.

Subjectively invalid names  
Subjectively invalid names are names that have been rendered invalid by individual scientific judgement or opinion. Taxonomists may differ in their opinion, and names considered invalid by one researcher may be considered valid by another; thus these are still potentially valid names. 

They include:

Junior subjective synonyms - synonyms described from different types, which were previously described as separate taxa, but are now understood to be the same taxon.

Junior secondary homonyms - In this case, the taxa are separate species, but they were previous classified in separate genera, and by chance they had been given the same specific name. When they came to occupy the same genus, this resulted in homonymy.

Conditionally suppressed names - these are special cases where a name that would otherwise have been valid has been petitioned for suppression by the International Commission on Zoological Nomenclature. This is usually because the junior synonym (the later name) has had far wider and far longer common usage than the senior synonym (the older name).

Objectively invalid names  

Objectively invalid names are names that have been rendered invalid for factual reasons. These names are universally accepted as invalid, and are not merely a matter of individual opinion, as is the case with subjectively invalid names. 

They include:

Junior objective synonyms – names describing a taxon (the junior synonym) that have already been described by another name earlier (the senior synonym). ICZN follows the Principle of Priority, in which the oldest available name is applied in preference to newer names where possible.
Junior homonyms in the family and genus group – names of families and genera which have the same spelling, but refer to different taxa.
Junior primary homonyms in a species group – species synonyms resulting from two different organisms being originally described with the same name which was spelled in the same way. Compare with the previously discussed junior secondary homonyms.
Completely suppressed names – are special cases where a name is completely suppressed by the International Commission on Zoological Nomenclature. It is treated as if it had never been published, and is never to be used, regardless of the actual availability.
Partially suppressed names – are special cases where a name is partially suppressed by the International Commission on Zoological Nomenclature. Unlike completely suppressed names, partially suppressed names are still acknowledged as having been published but is used only for the purpose of homonymy, not priority.

Different rules for botany
Under the International Code of Nomenclature for algae, fungi, and plants, the term validly published name has a different meaning that corresponds to zoology's available name. The botanical equivalent of zoology's term "valid name" is correct name.

See also
International Code of Zoological Nomenclature
Synonym (taxonomy)

References

Zoological nomenclature